Abgah (also Romanized as Ābgāh) is a village in Shahid Modarres Rural District, in the Central District of Shushtar County, Khuzestan Province, Iran. At the 2006 census, its population was 41, in 8 families.

References 

Populated places in Shushtar County